Following is a list of senators of Réunion, people who have represented the overseas department of Réunion in the Senate of France.

Third Republic

Senators for Réunion under the French Third Republic were:

Fourth Republic

Senators for Réunion under the French Fourth Republic were:

Fifth Republic 

The department of Réunion was represented by two senators from 1959, three from 1983 and four from 2011.
Senators for Réunion under the French Fifth Republic were:

References

Sources

 
Lists of members of the Senate (France) by department